Benjamin Whitaker may refer to:
Ben Whitaker (politician) (1934–2014), British Labour Party politician
Benjamin J. Whitaker (1956-2022), professor of chemical physics
Ben F. Whitaker (died 1954), American businessman, racehorse owner
Ben Whittaker, Australian rugby player
Benjamin Whittaker, British boxer